Taylor Carpenter-Phinney (born June 27, 1990) is an American retired professional road racing cyclist, who rode professionally between 2009 and 2019 for the ,  and  teams. Phinney specialized in time trials on the road as well as the individual pursuit on the track, winning the world title in the discipline in 2009 and 2010.

Early life and amateur career
Phinney was born on June 27, 1990, to former professional road cyclist and Olympic medal-winner Davis Phinney and former Olympic gold medal-winning cyclist and speed skater Connie Carpenter-Phinney.

In 2007 at the age of 16, Phinney began racing on Team Slipstream's junior squad. Slipstream team manager Jonathan Vaughters signed Phinney to the team before he had competed in a race, having heard word-of-mouth reports about Phinney's ability on group rides in Boulder. It was at this time that Phinney was introduced to track cycling. In August 2007, he won the World Junior Championships time trial title. Since then, Phinney has competed in National, World Cup and World Championship events for track cycling. Phinney finished seventh in the individual pursuit at the 2008 Summer Olympics. Later that year, at the U.S. National Track Championships, he won gold medals in the elite one kilometer time trial, individual pursuit and team pursuit races.

Professional career

Trek–Livestrong (2009–2010)
On September 24, 2008, Lance Armstrong announced that Phinney had made the under-23 team, which was organized by the group that managed Armstrong's , . On March 26, 2009, Phinney won the individual pursuit at the 2009 UCI Track Cycling World Championships and, again, at the 2010 UCI Track Cycling World Championships on March 25, 2010. Phinney then switched his focus to the road, winning the Paris–Roubaix Espoirs, the Olympia's Tour overall, in addition to the first four stages and time trials in Tour de l'Avenir and Tour of Utah.

BMC Racing (2011–2016)

On September 22, 2010, the  announced that Phinney would become part of BMC in 2011, joining a team that included Cadel Evans, George Hincapie and Alessandro Ballan. The highlight of Phinney's first season with BMC was a fourth-place finish in the Eneco Tour.

Phinney started the 2012 season by helping his team win the Giro del Trentino's team time trial, where he wore the leader's jersey for a day. His early target for the 2012 season was the opening stage of the Giro d'Italia, which he duly won to wear the leader's jersey, the maglia rosa, becoming just the third American to do so following Andrew Hampsten in 1988 and Christian Vande Velde in 2008. Phinney then switched his focus to the Olympic Games, targeting the road race and time trial, where he finished fourth in each event. He would go on to win the stage-seven individual time trial of the USA Pro Cycling Challenge. Phinney participated in the 2012 UCI World Road Race Championships. He was part of the six-man BMC team that took silver in the team time trial. Phinney also finished second to Tony Martin in the individual event, missing out on becoming World Champion by five seconds.

Amidst the turmoil of the Lance Armstrong–USADA affair, Phinney sent a tweet congratulating his teammate Steve Cummings for his stage win at the Tour of Beijing, saying "He [Cummings], like me, follows his own personal policy of no caffeine pills and no painkillers. Purest of the pure!" Phinney later explained his comment by stating that although legal, caffeine pills and mild painkillers were often used in the peloton during races, and that some riders even crushed them and mixed them in water bottles. He stated that he was entirely against that practice and doping in general.

On the penultimate stage of the 2013 Tirreno–Adriatico, in heavy rain, Phinney found himself well in arrears of the leaders on a tough finishing circuit, which included a climb at Sant'Elpidio a Mare with gradients reaching 27 percent. Around 30 other riders in the group abandoned the race with over 100 kilometers (62 miles) to go, but Phinney rode on alone in the hope of making the time limit, so he could compete in the final day's time trial. Ultimately, Phinney missed the time limit by over ten minutes.

In the early part of the 2014 season, Phinney won the inaugural Dubai Tour after winning the opening time-trial. In May, Phinney won a stage of the Tour of California. With more than 23 kilometers to the finish, Phinney broke away from a reduced peloton and won by 12 seconds. Soon after, Phinney was victorious for a second time at the United States National Time Trial Championships. Two days later, at the United States National Road Race Championships, Phinney suffered a career-threatening crash after sliding into a guard-rail. He was attempting to avoid a motorcycle on the descent of Lookout Mountain in Tennessee. His injuries—a compound fracture to his tibia and severed patellar tendon—required surgery. Phinney never wore his national jersey as he remained out of action for a year, having initially been given a six-to-eight-week recovery period.

At the end of 2015, Phinney participated in "Thereabouts 2", with Angus Morton, Lachlan Morton and Cameron Wurf. "Thereabouts 2" was an adventure-related cycling trip from Boulder, Colorado to Moab, Utah, while attempting to realize what makes cycling so special: adventure, friendship and a lack of structure.

Phinney spent the early part of the 2016 season recovering from his injuries, making his first race appearance of the year at the Tour du Haut Var in February and subsequently racing in the spring classics before returning from Europe to his native Colorado. In May 2016 Phinney took his third national time trial title in Winston-Salem, North Carolina, beating runner-up Tom Zirbel by over a minute: Phinney expressed satisfaction with the result and his performance, hoping that it would help him secure selection for the 2016 Summer Olympics. He competed at the Olympics, but despite entering the road time trial with hopes of a medal, he finished 22nd, over five minutes behind winner Fabian Cancellara.

Cannondale–Drapac Pro Cycling Team (2017–2019)
In June 2017, he was named in the start list for the 2017 Tour de France, marking his debut in the race. In an interview ahead of the Tour Phinney stated that he was still undergoing therapy to deal with the effects of his injuries, and said that the power output from his left side was almost 25 percent down on that from his right side when making an explosive effort. Phinney was leading the mountains classification and wearing the polka dot jersey competition on stage 2.

Retirement
In October 2019 Phinney announced that he would retire from professional racing at the end of the 2019 season. He cited the ongoing effects of an injury he suffered in 2014 as a reason for his retirement.

Career achievements

Major results

2007
 1st  Time trial, UCI Junior Road World Championships
 1st  Individual pursuit, National Track Championships
Tour de l'Abitibi
1st Stages 1 (ITT) & 2
2008
 1st  Individual pursuit, UCI Junior Track World Championships
 National Junior Track Championships
1st  Individual pursuit
1st  Track time trial
1st  Team pursuit
2009
 1st  Individual pursuit, UCI Track World Championships
 National Track Championships
1st  Individual pursuit
1st  Points race
1st  Team pursuit
 1st Paris–Roubaix Espoirs
 1st Stage 1 Flèche du Sud
2010
 1st  Individual pursuit, UCI Track World Championships
 1st  Time trial, UCI Road World Under–23 Championships
 1st  Time trial, National Road Championships
 1st  Overall Olympia's Tour
1st Prologue, Stages 1, 2 & 3
Tour of Utah
1st Prologue & Stage 3 (ITT)
 1st Paris–Roubaix Espoirs
 1st Stage 2b Le Triptyque des Monts et Châteaux
 1st Stage 4 Tour of the Gila
 1st Prologue Tour de l'Avenir
2011
 4th Overall Eneco Tour
1st Prologue
2012
 Giro d'Italia
1st Stage 1 (ITT) 
Held  after Stages 1–3
 1st Stage 7 (ITT) USA Pro Cycling Challenge
 1st Stage 1 (TTT) Giro del Trentino
 UCI Road World Championships
2nd  Team time trial
2nd  Time trial
 3rd Chrono des Nations
 Olympic Games
4th Road race
4th Time trial
2013
 1st Stage 4 Tour de Pologne
 3rd Overall Tour of Qatar
1st  Young rider classification
1st Stage 2 (TTT)
 3rd Giro di Toscana
 5th Time trial, UCI Road World Championships
 7th Milan–San Remo
2014
 1st  Time trial, National Road Championships
 1st  Overall Dubai Tour
1st  Young rider classification
1st Stage 1 (ITT)
 1st Stage 5 Tour of California
 7th Omloop Het Nieuwsblad
2015
 1st  Team time trial, UCI Road World Championships
 1st Stage 1 USA Pro Cycling Challenge
2016
 1st  Time trial, National Road Championships
 1st Stage 1 (TTT) Tirreno–Adriatico
 1st Stage 5 (TTT) Eneco Tour
 2nd  Team time trial, UCI Road World Championships
2017
 Tour de France
Held  after Stage 2
2018
 8th Paris–Roubaix
2019
 1st Stage 1 (TTT) Tour Colombia

Grand Tour general classification results timeline

References

External links

 
 
 

1990 births
Living people
American male cyclists
Cyclists at the 2008 Summer Olympics
Cyclists at the 2012 Summer Olympics
Cyclists at the 2016 Summer Olympics
Olympic cyclists of the United States
Sportspeople from Boulder, Colorado
UCI Track Cycling World Champions (men)
American Giro d'Italia stage winners
American track cyclists
Cyclists from Colorado